Streptocarpus saxorum, called the false African violet, is a species of flowering plant in the genus Streptocarpus, subgenus Streptocarpella, native to Kenya and Tanzania. It is an evergreen perennial that often bears flowers nearly year-round. Its "compact" variety has gained the Royal Horticultural Society's Award of Garden Merit as a houseplant.

References

saxorum
Flora of Kenya
Flora of Tanzania
Garden plants of Africa
House plants
Plants described in 1894